Maurice Salomez (10 April 1880 in Paris – 7 August 1916 in Ville-sur-Cousances) was a French track and field athlete who competed at the 1900 Summer Olympics in Paris, France. Salomez competed in the 800 metres.  He placed fourth in his first-round (semifinals) heat and did not advance to the final.

He was killed in action during World War I.

See also
 List of Olympians killed in World War I

References

External links
 De Wael, Herman. Herman's Full Olympians: "Athletics 1900". Accessed 18 March 2006.
 
 French Olympians: Q-Z 

1880 births
1916 deaths
Athletes (track and field) at the 1900 Summer Olympics
Olympic athletes of France
French male middle-distance runners
French military personnel killed in World War I
Athletes from Paris